Emmanuel "Manny" Meafou (born 12 July 1998) is a Australian professional rugby union player, who plays as a lock for French Top 14 club Toulouse. 

Born in New Zealand from Samoan parents, he moved to Australia, where he was raised.

Early life
Shortly afterwards, his family relocated to Queensland: first to Brisbane and then to Ipswich where he grew up. His nickname is Manny. 

At the age of five, he started playing rugby league at Ipswich Grammar School in South East Queensland. He only swicthed to rugby union at sixteen years old, playing for Brothers. In 2015, Meafou was selected to play for the Queensland II side in the Australian Schools Rugby Championships.

Professional career
In 2017, Meafou first played for National Rugby Championship professional team Melbourne Rising before, one year after, playing for both Shute Shield side Warringah and NSW Country Eagles. 

Following the 2018 season, having no offers to pursue his professional career in rugby, he had a brief opportunity to switch to American football and play in the National Football League via the International Player Pathway Program. Meafou stated: "Rugby was still a passion and dream of mine. The only reason I went down the NFL road was because I had no offers. For me rugby was over."

Toulouse
After his agent allegedly sent footage of Meafou to French rugby clubs, Meafou received several offers and positive reponses before accepting to join Toulouse youth development system. He then left Australia for France in December 2018.

On 21 December 2019, he played his first professional game in France with his new club after having signed an 'Espoir' (U21) contract in January until 2021.

Next season, he won the 2020–21 European Rugby Champions Cup and 2020-21 Top 14 double with the French team.

On 4 January 2023, he extended his contract with Toulouse until 2025.

International career

Being born in New Zealand before moving to Australia as a young child, Meafou is eligible to play for both the All Blacks and the Wallabies. However, being an uncapped player he would not be allowed to be called up by Australia via the Giteau Law policy. 

Since his arrival in Toulouse in December 2018, Meafou has publicly declared his love to his new homeland and said he would like to play for France. Toulouse stated that he passed a French language exam in 2022 in order to become a French citizen.

On 12 March 2023, he was called up to the France national team as an additional player and training partner since he was not eligible to play for his adoptive country yet.

Honours

Toulouse
 European Rugby Champions Cup: 2020–21
 Top 14: 2020-21

Warringah
 Shute Shield runner-up: 2018

References

External links
 Stade Toulousain
 EPCR
 All.Rugby
 It's Rugby 

Living people
1998 births
Australian rugby union players  
Rugby union locks
Australian expatriate rugby union players 
Expatriate rugby union players in France
Australian expatriate sportspeople in France
Melbourne Rising players
Stade Toulousain players
New South Wales Country Eagles players